Hugh Lyons-Montgomery (1816 – 16 July 1882) was an Irish Conservative Party politician.

Baptised on 31 March 1816, Lyons-Montgomery was the son of Hugh Lyons-Montgomery and Eliza Blacker. In 1840, he married Elizabeth Smith, daughter of Henry Smith, and they had 14 children: Florence Maud; Eveline Clemina (died 1928); Ada Louisa Mary; Henrietta Emily Anne; Alfred Otho; Hugh; Norma Wilhelmina (died 1876); Ethel Constance; Beatrice Cicely Blanche; Elizabeth Sophia (1841–1918); Caroline Matilda (1842–1877); Henry Willoughby Stewart (born 1850); Lambert de Winton (1853–1939); and Kyneston Forster Walter (born 1859).

In 1840, Lyons-Montgomery became High Sheriff of County Leitrim before being elected  as Member of Parliament (MP) for Leitrim at the 1852 general election and held the seat until 1858 when he resigned by accepting the office of Steward of the Manor of Hempholme.

Lyons-Montgomery was also a Deputy Lieutenant and a Justice of the Peace of County Leitrim.

References

External links
 

1816 births
1882 deaths
Irish Conservative Party MPs
Deputy Lieutenants of Leitrim
Irish justices of the peace
High Sheriffs of Leitrim
Members of the Parliament of the United Kingdom for County Leitrim constituencies (1801–1922)
UK MPs 1852–1857
UK MPs 1857–1859